A zoster (zōstēr) was a form of girdle or belt worn by men and perhaps later by women in ancient Greece, from the Archaic period (c. 750 – c. 500 BC) to the Hellenistic period (323–30 BC). 

The word occurs in Homer, where it appears to refer to a warrior's belt of leather, possibly covered in bronze plates.  Later references in the late Archaic and early Classical periods show it used as a belt or cloth girdle with men's clothes, especially the shorter chiton.

By the Hellenistic period, it had become synonymous with "zone" and was used for women's clothes as well as men's.

The zoster was also worn and is still worn by Greeks when wearing traditional costumes (regional clothing).

See also
Clothing in ancient Greece

References

Belts (clothing)
Greek clothing